Peter Gergely (born 23 November 1964) is a former football player from Slovakia and last manager of FC ViOn Zlaté Moravce. His former managed teams were Slovakia U-18 team and Slovakia U-19 team.

References

1964 births
Living people
Slovak footballers
FK Dubnica players
Slovak Super Liga players
Slovak football managers
FK Dubnica managers
Spartak Myjava managers
Association footballers not categorized by position
FC ViOn Zlaté Moravce managers